Blue Rock Studio was an independent 16- and 24-track recording facility located in Manhattan's SoHo district. Founded by owner Eddie Korvin, it opened in 1970 and was sold in 1986.

Early years
After meeting John Storyk, a recent architecture graduate, at the Electric Circus and Cerebrum, a club Storyk designed, Korvin hired Storyk to design the new studio located in a three-level, standalone cast iron building on Greene Street. Storyk, whose first two studio jobs were Electric Lady Studios and Blue Rock, designed the recording room, control room and reception space on the street-level floor. Tom Dwyer and Ken Robertson, electronic designers and builders at one of New York's major labels, worked nights and weekends building a custom solid state console, installing all additional equipment including Scully 16-, 4-, and 2-track tape machines. Seeking additional help, Korvin invited long-time friend Joe Schick to return to New York and become a partner in the studio. Upon opening to clients, Schick served primarily as studio manager for about four years before departing Blue Rock. Korvin handled the majority of engineering duties and became chief engineer. Blue Rock was also one of the first New York studios to employ a female engineer, Jan Rathbun.

Musically diverse, the first two 1971 sessions at Blue Rock for start-up Perception Records were an American remix of the 45 rpm hit single "Dancing in the Moonlight" by King Harvest and a mixdown of a live club recording by jazz saxophonist James Moody. One of the attractions of Blue Rock was privacy and discretion. "I like it. I’ll be back", said Bob Dylan after checking out the studio one afternoon. A three-day booking was arranged for March 1971 where Dylan, backed by Leon Russell and band, jammed and recorded "Watching the River Flow" and "When I Paint My Masterpiece". Both songs were subsequently released on CBS Records and Dylan returned to Blue Rock on two other occasions later in 1971.

Later years
Around 1975, Korvin decided a partial remodel and equipment upgrade were necessary. Estelle Lazarus was hired as studio manager and public relations person. Around the same time, Michael Ewasko joined the studio as assistant engineer to Eddie Korvin. Later, Ewasko was promoted to chief engineer, a position he kept until the closing of the studio in 1986. Architect Storyk designed the control room remodel and the studio upgraded to Studer 24- and 2-track tape machines and a Neve 8058 console. Original audio designers Dwyer and Robertson oversaw the installation of the new equipment. Notable clients in the later years were The Kinks (2 albums and 1 soundtrack), The Spinners' single "Working My Way Back to You", Keith Richards and Screamin' Jay Hawkins 1979 version "I Put a Spell on You" and the Joe Jackson platinum-selling album, Night and Day, including the song "Steppin' Out", Grammy-nominated for 1983 Record of the Year and Best Male Pop Vocal Performance.

It is of interest to highlight the concentration of jazz composers and players who recorded at Blue Rock throughout its working years. Korvin had a business relationship with Mike Mantler and Carla Bley (Jazz Composers Orchestra) that produced many recording sessions and resulting albums. Later, the studio had a close working relationship with Manhattan-based Muse Records. This jazz-oriented company, headed by Joe Fields, was specifically interested in recording the diverse, vibrant and often experimental music that pervaded New York City. In fact, Eddie Korvin once recorded a visiting group of Swiss-German yodelers accompanied by 13-foot-long alphorns. In this pre-digital era, Blue Rock welcomed an eclectic group of clients and performers in the fields of rock, pop, jazz, folk, classical, dance, TV and radio commercials, film and TV scores, and sounds without category. Music, from the traditional to the interstellar, was played and recorded at Blue Rock Studio.

Partial list of artists recorded

 Bob Dylan, Greatest Hits II
 The Fugs
 New York Dolls
 Bob Marley
 Leon Russell
 Bette Midler
 Judy Collins
 Barbra Streisand
 Keith Richards
 Screamin' Jay Hawkins
 Allan Schwartzberg
 Elliott Randall
 Jerry Friedman
 David Horowitz
 Neil Jason
 Will Lee
 Alan Gordon
 The Chambers Brothers
 Ramones
 Fatback Band
 The Kinks
 Black Ivory
 Patrick Adams
 Tom Verlaine
 The dB's
 John Simon
 Jack Richardson
 Bob Kaminsky
 Michael Cuscuna
 David Kershenbaum
 Ron Frangipane
 Loudon Wainwright III
 The Roches
 Richard Thompson
 U2
 Talking Heads
 Robert Fripp
 Brian Eno
 David Byrne
 Mike Oldfield
 The Spinners
 Rupert Holmes
 Gene Simmons
 John Fahey
 The Waitresses
 Gary McMahan
 Chuck Jackson
 Barrabás
 Jeff Kent & Doug Lubahn
 David Nichtern
 Nile Rodgers
 Eumir Deodato
 Fats Domino
 Tom Sullivan
 The Facedancers
 John Herald
 Bonnie Tyler
 Nina Hagen
 Tom Waits
 Todd Rundgren
 Rickie Lee Jones
 Saturday Night Live Band 1980 featuring Paul Shaffer, David Sanborn and Marcus Miller
 Joe Jackson, Night and Day
 Brecker Brothers
 Teo Macero
 Astrud Gilberto
 Houston Person
 Stuff
 Sonny Stitt
 James Moody
 Pat Martino
 Roswell Rudd
 Gil Evans
 Shirley Horn
 Steve Lacy
 Dave Holland
 Paul Motian
 Billy Hart
 Willie Colón
 Howard Johnson
 Johnny Hartman
 George Benson
 David Sanborn
 Woody Shaw
 John Abercrombie
 Charlie Haden
 Gato Barbieri
 Lester Bowie
 Howard McGhee
 Joe Bonner
 David Murray
 Larry Young
 Dee Dee Bridgewater
 Marvin Hannibal Peterson
 Chico Freeman
 Doc Cheatham
 Kenny Davern
 Tony Parenti
 Freddie Moore
 Bernard Purdie
 Richard Tee
 Steve Gadd
 Ron Carter
 Carla Bley & Mike Mantler
 Bob Babbitt
 Duck Dunn
 Don Cherry
 Eddie Jefferson
 Robin Kenyatta
 Art Farmer
 Cedar Walton
 Richie Cole
 Buster Williams
 Paul Griffin
 Red Rodney
 Cecil Payne
 Enrico Rava
 Grachan Moncur III
 Ornette Coleman
 Jeanne Lee
 Spyro Gyra
 Harold Vick
 Richard Davis
 Clifford Thornton
 Rickie Boger
 Tyrone Washington
 Rashied Ali
 Bobby Naughton
 Muhal Richard Abrams
 Claudio Roditi
 Kenny Barron
 Ahmed Abdullah
 Beaver Harris
 Jaco Pastorius
 Pat Metheny
 Paul Bley
 Bob Moses
 Sun Ra
 Philip Glass
 Frederic Rzewski
 John Cage
 Steve Reich
 Hal Willner
 Elizabeth Swados
 Joe Papp
 Diane Keaton
 William Shatner
 Susan Birkenhead
 Giorgio Gomelski
 Twyla Tharp
 Laurie Anderson
 EDK Productions
 Robert Traynor & Sirocco
 Steve Hiett
 Barry Goldberg with Bob Dylan
 Tom "T-Bone" Wolk
 Robbie Kondor
 Billy Mernit
 Arthur Gorson
 Thom Bishop
 Elly Brown
 David Sutherland
 Claude Pelanne/WCVB-Boston
 Jérôme Laperrousaz

References

Recording studios in New York City